St. Anne's Church is a Roman Catholic church in Koprivna in the Municipality of Črna na Koroškem, northern Slovenia. The altar of the Black Madonna dates to the 14th century.

References

External links
Church of Sv. Ana 

Anne's Church